KSJZ (93.3 FM, "Mix 93.3") is a radio station broadcasting a hot adult contemporary music format. The station serves Jamestown, North Dakota, Stutsman County, and surrounding small towns including Valley City, Carrington, Edgeley, and others in an 80-mile radius.  It is owned by Chesterman Communications.

Both KSJB and KSJZ broadcast from studios at the Buffalo Mall. They share a transmitter site south of Jamestown, on Highway 281.

KSJZ first signed on the air in 1967 with the calls KSJM.  Those calls were changed to KSJZ on November 12, 1990 after being purchased by Chesterman Company.  From 1967 until early 1991, the station ran automated reel tapes with different music formats.  In 1991, they began operating as an Adult Contemporary music station with a live morning deejay and satellite programming the rest of the day.  On April 2, 2012 KSJZ changed its format from adult contemporary (as "Kiss 93.3") to hot AC, branded as "Mix 93.3 under the direction of Radio Consulting Services' Jon Holiday".

References

External links
Mix 93.3 official website

SJZ
Hot adult contemporary radio stations in the United States
Jamestown, North Dakota
1967 establishments in North Dakota